Marie-Bernadette Thomas is a French football player who played as Defender for French club  Stade de Reims of the Division 1 Féminine. Thomas represented France in the first FIFA sanctioned women's international against the Netherlands.

References

1955 births
Paris Saint-Germain Féminine players
Stade de Reims Féminines players
French women's footballers
Division 1 Féminine players
Women's association football defenders
France women's international footballers
Living people